John Crowe may refer to:

John Crowe Ransom (1888–1974), American poet, essayist, social and political theorist, man of letters, and academic
John James Crowe (1876–1965), English recipient of the Victoria Cross
Jack Crowe (born 1947), head football coach at the University of Arkansas
John Henry Crowe (born 1943), physiologist at the University of California, Davis
John H. Crowe III, game designer for Pagan Publishing
John Crowe (Irish politician), mayor of County Clare
John Crowe (Canadian politician) (1784–1878), Nova Scotia politician
John Finley Crowe (1787–1860), Presbyterian minister and founder of Hanover College, Hanover, Indiana
John Rice Crowe (1795–1877), English businessman and diplomat

See also
John Crow (disambiguation)